Khashauh (also Romanized as Khashāūh; also known as Khashū) is a village in Deh Tall Rural District, in the Central District of Bastak County, Hormozgan Province, Iran. At the 2006 census, its population was 12, in 4 families.

References 

Populated places in Bastak County